PDX1 (pancreatic and duodenal homeobox 1), also known as insulin promoter factor 1, is a transcription factor in the ParaHox gene cluster. In vertebrates, Pdx1 is necessary for pancreatic development, including β-cell maturation, and duodenal differentiation. In humans this protein is encoded by the PDX1 gene, which was formerly known as IPF1. The gene was originally identified in the clawed frog Xenopus laevis  and is present widely across the evolutionary diversity of bilaterian animals, although it has been lost in evolution in arthropods and nematodes.  Despite the gene name being Pdx1, there is no Pdx2 gene in most animals; single-copy Pdx1 orthologs have been identified in all mammals.  Coelacanth and cartilaginous fish are, so far, the only vertebrates shown to have two Pdx genes, Pdx1 and Pdx2.

Function

Pancreatic development 

In pancreatic development, Pdx1 is expressed by a population of cells in the posterior foregut region of the definitive endoderm, and Pdx1+ epithelial cells give rise to the developing pancreatic buds, and eventually, the whole of the pancreas—its exocrine, endocrine, and ductal cell populations. Pancreatic Pdx1+ cells first arise at mouse embryonic day 8.5-9.0 (E8.5-9.0), and Pdx1 expression continues until E12.0-E12.5. Homozygous Pdx1 knockout mice form pancreatic buds but fail to develop a pancreas, and transgenic mice in which tetracycline application results in death of Pdx1+ cells are almost completely apancreatic if doxycycline (tetracycline derivative) is administered throughout the pregnancy of these transgenic mice, illustrating the necessity of Pdx1+ cells in pancreatic development.

Pdx1 is accepted as the earliest marker for pancreatic differentiation, with the fates of pancreatic cells controlled by downstream transcription factors. The initial pancreatic bud is composed of Pdx1+ pancreatic progenitor cells that co-express Hlxb9, Hnf6, Ptf1a and NKX6-1. These cells further proliferate and branch in response to FGF-10 signaling. Afterwards, differentiation of the pancreatic cells begins; a population of cells has Notch signaling inhibited, and subsequently, expresses Ngn3. This Ngn3+ population is a transient population of pancreatic endocrine progenitors that gives rise to the α, β, Δ, PP, and ε cells of the islets of Langerhans. Other cells will give rise to the exocrine and ductal pancreatic cell populations.

β-cell maturation and survival 

The final stages of pancreas development involves the production of different endocrine cells, including insulin-producing β-cells and glucagon-producing α-cells. Pdx1 is necessary for β-cell maturation: developing β-cells co-express Pdx1, NKX6-1, and insulin, a process that results in the silencing of MafB and the expression of MafA, a necessary switch in maturation of β-cells. At this stage of pancreas development, the experimental decrease in the expression of Pdx1 results in a production of a smaller number of β-cells and an associated increase in the number of α-cells.

In the mature pancreas, Pdx1 expression seems to be required for the maintenance and survival of β-cells. For instance, experimentally reducing the level of Pdx1 expression at this stage makes β-cells produce higher amounts of glucagon, suggesting that Pdx1 inhibits the conversion of β-cells into α-cells. Furthermore, Pdx1 appears to be important in mediating the effect of insulin on the apoptotic programmed cell death of β-cells: a small concentration of insulin protects β-cells from apoptosis, but not in cells where Pdx1 expression has been inhibited.

Duodenum 

Pdx1 is necessary for the development of the proximal duodenum and maintenance of the gastro-duodenal junction.  Duodenal enterocytes, Brunner's glands and entero-endocrine cells (including those in the gastric antrum) are dependent on Pdx1 expression.  It is a ParaHox gene, which together with Sox2 and Cdx2, determines the correct cellular differentiation in the proximal gut.  In mature mice duodenum, several genes have been identified which are dependent on Pdx1 expression and include some affecting lipid and iron absorption.

Pathology 

Experiments in animal models have shown that a reduction in Pdx1 expression can cause symptoms that are characteristic of Diabetes mellitus type 1 and Diabetes mellitus type 2. Furthermore, expression of Pdx1 is lost in gastric cancers, suggesting a role for the gene as a tumor suppressor. Maturity onset diabetes of the young (Type 4) can be caused by heterozygous mutations in Pdx1. The fat sand rat Psammomys obesus, a species with susceptibility to Diabetes mellitus type 2 symptoms, has a highly divergent Pdx1 gene sequence compared with other mammals.

Interactions
Pdx1 has been shown to interact with MAFA.

References

Further reading

External links
  GeneReviews/NCBI/NIH/UW entry on Permanent Neonatal Diabetes Mellitus
 

Transcription factors